Aoulouz or Aoullouz (Shilha Berber Awlluẓ) is a rural commune and small town in Taroudant Province, Souss-Massa Region, Morocco. According to the 2004 census it has a population of 5,756.

References

Populated places in Taroudannt Province
Rural communes of Souss-Massa